Real Rimini Football Club was an Italian association football club located in Rimini, Emilia-Romagna.

History

The sports title of Valleverde Riccione 
The origins of the team go back to 1921 when the former Valleverde Riccione F.C. was founded in Riccione. In summer of 2010 its sports title of Serie D was moved to the city of Rimini to create Real Rimini F.C.. In the meanwhile, Valleverde Riccione FC was refounded as A.S.D. Riccione 1929.

Real Rimini 
Real Rimini F.C. was relocated to take the place of Rimini Calcio F.C., an historical club of the city, that had financial problems. However, Rimini Calcio was later admitted to Serie D with the new denomination of A.C. Rimini 1912.

Real Rimini F.C. was fielded anyway, so the town of Rimini had two city derbies in the Serie D 2010–11: in this season it ranks ninth. Real Rimini lost both the matches with the results of 0–2 and 0-3 respectively. In the season 2011–12 it was relegated to Eccellenza. The club was dissolved in November 2012 by retiring, for financial problems at the beginning of the next season of Eccellenza.

Colors and badge 
Its colours were white and red.

References 

Football clubs in Italy
Football clubs in Emilia-Romagna
Rimini
Association football clubs established in 2010
Association football clubs disestablished in 2012
2010 establishments in Italy
2012 disestablishments in Italy